"A Logic Named Joe" is a science fiction short story by American writer Murray Leinster, first published in the March 1946 issue of Astounding Science Fiction.  (The story appeared under Leinster's real name, Will F. Jenkins. That issue of Astounding also included a story under the Leinster pseudonym called "Adapter".)  The story is particularly noteworthy as a prediction of massively networked personal computers and their drawbacks, written at a time when computing was in its infancy.

Plot 
The story's narrator is a "logic repairman" nicknamed Ducky. A "logic" is a computer-like device described as looking "like a vision receiver used to, only it's got keys instead of dials and you punch the keys for what you wanna get".

In the story, a logic (whom Ducky later calls Joe) develops some degree of sapience and ambition. Joe proceeds to switch around a few relays in "the tank" (one of a distributed set of central information repositories), and cross-correlate all information ever assembled – yielding highly unexpected results.  It then proceeds to freely disseminate all of those results to everyone on demand (and simultaneously disabling all of the content-filtering protocols).  Logics begin offering up unexpected assistance to everyone which includes designing custom chemicals that alleviate inebriation,  giving sex advice to small children, and plotting the perfect murder.

Eventually Ducky "saves civilization" by locating and turning off the only logic capable of doing this.

Publication history 
"A Logic Named Joe" has appeared in the collections Sidewise in Time (Shasta, 1950), The Best of Murray Leinster (Del Rey, 1978), First Contacts (NESFA, 1998), and A Logic Named Joe (Baen, 2005), and was also included in the Machines That Think compilation, with notes by Isaac Asimov, published 1984 Holt, Rinehart, and Winston.

This story was also published in The Great Science Fiction Stories, Volume 8, 1946
Edited by Isaac Asimov and Martin H. Greenberg, DAW Books, November 1982

Listen to 
  A Logic Named Joe, Dimension X (episode #13), NBC radio, July 1, 1950
  A Logic Named Joe, X Minus One, December 28, 1955

External links 
 

Fictional computers
1946 short stories
Science fiction short stories
Works originally published in Analog Science Fiction and Fact
Works by Murray Leinster